New Paltz is a village in Ulster County located in the U.S. state of New York. The population was 7,324 at the 2020 census.

New Paltz is located within the town of New Paltz. It is also home to the State University of New York at New Paltz, founded in 1828. The town is served by exit 18 on the New York State Thruway (I-87), as well as state routes 299, 32, and 208, and is about 90 minutes from both New York City and Albany.

History 
The Elting Memorial Library, Guilford-Bower Farm House, Jean Hasbrouck House, Major Jacob Hasbrouck Jr. House, Huguenot Street Historic District, Lake Mohonk Mountain House Complex, New Paltz Downtown Historic District, and The Locusts are listed on the National Register of Historic Places.

Early development 

New Paltz was founded in 1678 by French Huguenots settlers, including Louis DuBois, who had taken refuge in Mannheim, Germany, for a brief period of time, being married there in 1655, before emigrating to the Dutch colony of New Netherland in 1660 with his family. Mannheim was a major town of the Palatinate (in German, the Pfalz), at the time a center of Protestantism.  The settlers lived in Wiltwyck (present day Kingston, New York) and in 1677 purchased a patent for the land surrounding present day New Paltz from a Lenape tribe known as the Esopus.

The people of Mannheim use a dialect form of the name Pfalz without the "f", pronouncing it "Paltz." Records of the New Paltz Reformed Church, which was formed in 1683, show the name of the settlement was first expressed not in German, nor in English, but in French: Nouveau Palatinat. The community was governed by a kind of corporation called the Duzine, referring to the twelve partners who acquired the royal patent. That form of government continued well past the time of the American Revolution, by special action of the New York State legislature.

The  or so of the patent, stretching to the Hudson River and augmented soon by the other patents on the south, were eventually divided among those twelve partners, their relatives, and a few friends into large plots – part wilderness and part farm. The farms were grouped principally around the heights west and east of the Wallkill River. The commercial center serving the agricultural base was located on the east shore of the Wallkill River, in the area where the first settlers had built their shelters. The street is now known as Huguenot Street.

 There, the church, schools, blacksmith, seamstresses, and stores flourished for the benefit of farmers who required goods such as seed, tools, clothing, and food not available on all farms, including alcoholic beverages. The church, which was also used as a school, was located here.  Many of the buildings still stand today, as a living museum community.

Population slowly spread from the Wallkill up along the street now known as North Front Street and then along what is now Chestnut Street.  In the nineteenth century, development continued along what is now Main Street.  The secession of the town of Lloyd and parts of Shawangunk, Esopus, and Gardiner, between 1843 and 1853, reduced New Paltz to its present size. In 1887, the village of New Paltz was incorporated within the eponymous town.

Higher education has been one of the main concerns of the community since the 1830s, with facilities on Huguenot and North Front streets. Late in the nineteenth century, the college was built in the area of Plattekill Avenue and Manheim Boulevard, where the State University of New York at New Paltz now stands.

The Wallkill Valley Railroad reached New Paltz by 1870, and provided passenger service through the town until 1937. After the rail line's closure in 1977, the section of the corridor running through New Paltz was converted to the Wallkill Valley Rail Trail, and the former train station in New Paltz was renovated as a restaurant, The Station.
Many different types of restaurants are located in New Paltz, including several that have earned high ratings from both local and national critics, making it a destination for those seeking a variety of good food.

Geography
According to the United States Census Bureau, the village has a total area of 1.8 square miles (4.6 km2), of which 1.7 square miles (4.5 km2)  is land and 0.04 square mile (0.1 km2)  (1.70%) is water.

The Wallkill River runs north along the western border of New Paltz, flowing into the Rondout Creek and eventually the Hudson River.

Demographics

As of the census of 2000, there were 6,034 people, 1898 households, and 586 families residing in the village. The population density was 3482.5 people per square mile (1346.7/km2). There were 1,957 housing units at an average density of 1,129.5 per square mile (436.8/km2). The racial makeup of the village was 73.42% white, 7.79% black or African American, 0.27% Native American, 7.01% Asian, 0.10% Pacific Islander, 8.35% from other races, and 3.07% from two or more races. Hispanic or Latino of any race were 11.93% of the population.

There were 1,898 households, out of which 12.9% had children under the age of 18 living with them, 21.1% were married couples living together, 7.3% had a female householder with no husband present, and 69.1% were non-families. 41.1% of all households were made up of individuals, and 7.2% had someone living alone who was 65 years of age or older. The average household size was 2.03 and the average family size was 2.66.

In the village, the age of population was disbursed as such: 6.9% under the age of 18, 58.7% from 18 to 24, 19.0% from 25 to 44, 10.1% from 45 to 64, and 5.3% who were 65 years of age or older.  The median age was 22 years. For every 100 females, there were 80.8 males. For every 100 females age 18 and over, there were 78.8 males.

The median income for a household in the village was $21,747, and the median income for a family was $51,186. Males had a median income of $33,103 versus $22,935 for females. The per capita income for the village was $11,644. About 11.8% of families and 36.9% of the population were below the poverty line, including 18.6% of those under age 18 and 12.2% of those age 65 or over.

New Paltz in fiction 
New Paltz was the place in which the character Penny Johnson (Cynthia Rhodes) got an abortion in the 1987 movie Dirty Dancing, which was set in the early 1960s.
It was also the village visited by Miss Sara Howard during the investigation of a sadistic killer's origins, in the novel The Alienist by Caleb Carr.
The town is mentioned in Paul Simon's song "Killer Wants to Go To College" on his album Songs from The Capeman.
New Paltz was fictionalized as "Little Heart" in the 2013 novel The Cusp of Sad by Nikki Pison about the 1980s punk rock street and music scene.

Politics 
The current mayor is Tim Rogers, who was elected in May 2015 to a four-year term and reelected in 2019 for another term. The four trustees on the village board are KT Tobin, William Murray, Alexandria Wojcik, and Michele Zipp.  The Village Board of Trustees meets on the second and fourth Wednesdays of the month at 7:00 p.m. at the village hall.

Sewer and water districts for the village are maintained through a department of public works.  Rehabilitation of the sewer system, which has been found to overflow raw sewage onto local streets and into the Wallkill, is expected under a consent order agreed to in 2003.

In 2004, then-Mayor Jason West helped catapult the village into the national spotlight as one of two locations in early 2004 to marry same-sex couples.

The Women in Black have a small but active chapter in New Paltz that has been protesting in front of Elting Memorial Library weekly since November, 2001.

Newspapers 

The first local newspaper in New Paltz, the New Paltz Times, was founded by Charles J. Ackert, who printed its first issue on July 6, 1860. It was a weekly paper in which the Democratic Party was supported. The New Paltz Independent, a Republican newspaper, was founded in 1868. Both the Times and Independent merged in 1919, becoming the New Paltz Independent and Times that ran until 1972, when it became the Old Dutch New Paltz Independent and Times. That same year it was renamed the Old Dutch independent, and ran until it was discontinued in 1975. The New Paltz News was founded in 1935, and merged with the Wallkill paper Wallkill Valley World in 1980. The Huguenot Herald was first published in 1976 and merged in 1985 with the Highland paper, the Highland Herald. At SUNY New Paltz, a college newspaper, the New Paltz Oracle, was founded in 1938, . The Huguenot Herald and New Paltz News continued to run until they were merged by the owner of Ulster Publishing as the New Paltz Times in 2001. The modern New Paltz Times is published weekly, and has no continuity with the 19th-century paper of the same name.

Culture
 
New Paltz hosts a number of cultural events.

Unity in Diversity Day
This event, paid for through the village, town, and SUNY New Paltz, celebrated the differences among people through food, spoken word poetry, artistic endeavors and theatrical performance. The last known theme, in 2007, was derived from Dr. Seuss's story about Sneetches.

Halloween
Haunted Hasbrouck Park
For over a quarter of a century the Guenther family put on a free haunted house for area residents, which attracted thousands of visitors on Halloween night. After complaints about traffic and noise concerns, owners Ann and Dan Guenther announced in 2006 that they would no longer create the attraction. However, interest continued, and the attraction was relocated to Hasbrouck Park in 2007, utilizing the park's castle playground as a centerpiece. This move also increased community involvement for the event for the two years it was held there, drawing upon the local YMCA, village employees, and volunteers from the area.

Halloween parade
A parade on Halloween night has been conducted through the village since the 1960s.

Haunted Huguenot Street
On the nights leading up to Halloween, stories of spirits, tragedy, misfortune and the paranormal fill the 330-year-old street under the moniker of "Haunted Huguenot Street" tours.

Night of 100 Pumpkins
Since 1990 this pumpkin-carving contest has been hosted at a local eatery called the Bakery.

Pride parade
A pride parade celebrating LGBT culture is a focus of pride celebrations in June, drawing a number of out-of-town visitors to see the community where same-sex weddings were performed when they were still illegal.

Memorial Day parade
The local Memorial Day parade is always held on the actual Memorial Day, not the Monday substitute agreed upon in Congress.

Turkey Trot
A fundraising run on Thanksgiving to support Family of New Paltz.

New Paltz Regatta
A river race using home made boats that was started in 1955 by Delta Kappa fraternity at SUNY New Paltz.  It has since been taken over by local citizens and is held in May every year to celebrate the start of Summer.

Recreation

Biking and hiking 
The Mohonk Preserve, Mohonk Mountain House and Minnewaska State Park offer biking and hiking opportunities in an area deemed picturesque by tourism supporters.

The Wallkill Valley Rail Trail passes through New Paltz and runs concurrently with the Empire State Trail for a distance.

Transportation

Automobile
New Paltz is exit 18 on the New York State Thruway, which is also designated as Interstate 87.

Bus
There is frequent bus service between The Port Authority Bus Terminal in New York City and New Paltz provided by Trailways of New York, with connections to many other villages and cities in New York State. Express bus service is also available from New Paltz to New York City via Trailways of New York, serving the park-ride lot at Exit 18 of the Thruway. Ulster County Area Transit also provides service to Metro-North Railroad in Poughkeepsie, along with local bus service to Kingston, Newburgh, and points in between along Route 32.  In January 2009 the New Paltz Loop Bus, stopping at points throughout the community, was launched.

Air
Stewart International Airport is the nearest major airport to New Paltz. It is located in Newburgh, thirty minutes to the south.

Rail 

The Wallkill Valley Railroad, founded in 1866, stretched from Montgomery to Kingston. The New Paltz railroad station was originally built in 1870, rebuilt after a 1907 fire. The railroad and station later came under New York Central ownership. The NYC operated two trains a day, each direction, on a Kingston-New Paltz-Montgomery run. At Kingston, connections were available trains north to Albany and south to Weehawken, New Jersey. The passenger service through New Paltz ended in 1937, and the rail division was abandoned by Conrail in 1983. The former roadbed was converted for use as the Wallkill Valley Rail Trail. 

The former station (now called La Stazione) was sold to private interests in 1959. The building was in a state of disrepair by the early 1980s, but renovated in 1988 and converted to an Italian restaurant in 1999.

The nearest active railroad station is the Poughkeepsie Metro-North station, which is served by several Amtrak trains and is the terminus for the Metro-North Railroad's Hudson Line. The Hudson Line stretches from Poughkeepsie to Grand Central Terminal in New York City. Poughkeepsie is a 15-20 minute drive east of New Paltz.

Transportation plan
In 2006, the town and village officials agreed to pay for a transportation study to analyze the transportation needs of the area. The study's suggestions included turning Main Street into a one-way route and improving bicycle and pedestrian access. An implementation committee was appointed in 2007 to study ways to use the plan.

Notable people
 Louis Dubois, founder of one of the earliest Huguenot colonies in the Americas.
 Abe Attell, boxing champion.
 Lewis DuBois, descendant of the original Huguenot refugees and a military commander in the Continental Army during the American Revolution.
 Mary Gordon, novelist.
 Peter Dinklage, actor.
Benjamin F. Church, Milwaukee, Wisconsin pioneer
Jay Le Fevre, former US Congress member
John Turturro, Hollywood Actor
Sandy Duncan, actor of Broadway theatre and television fame.
Terry Austin, comic book Artist and Inker
Floyd Patterson, heavyweight boxing champion.
Dana Lyons, folk music and alternative rock musician
Charles Davis, NFL Television Commentator
Keith Schiller, Deputy Assistant and Director of Oval Office Operations for President Donald Trump
Andrew Yang, founder of Venture for America and 2020 candidate for U.S. president
Vladimir Feltsman, Distinguished Professor of Piano at the State University of New York at New Paltz
Owen King, author and son of Stephen King.

Sister city
 Niimi, Okayama, Japan

See also

References

Pison, Nikki. "The Cusp of Sad." 2013. Little Heart Press: Rosendale, NY.

https://www.foxnews.com/us/small-town-rallies-in-support-of-american-flag-mural-after-initial-outcry

Bibliography

External links

Village of New Paltz Official Site

 
Villages in New York (state)
Huguenot history in the United States
Palatine German settlement in New York (state)
Populated places established in 1678
Wallkill River
Shawangunks
Villages in Ulster County, New York
1678 establishments in the Province of New York